Romania made its Paralympic Games début at the 1972 Summer Paralympics in Heidelberg, sending a single representative (Alex Peer) to compete in table tennis. He was eliminated in his first match. The country was then absent from the Paralympics until the 1996 Summer Games, where it was again represented by a single competitor (Aurel Berbec in powerlifting). Romania was represented again by just one athlete in 2000, and two in 2004, but sent a larger delegation of five athletes to the 2008 Summer Games. It first participated in the Winter Games in 2010. Its sole representative was Laura Valeanu, who entered two events in alpine skiing.

Romania made its best participation in the history of the Paralympic Games at the 1992 Summer Games, when the country's athletes finished the games in eighteenth place with 10 gold, 6 silver and 7 bronze medals won at the Paralympic Games held in Madrid. However these medals were added to the Barcelona final medal table added to the total won in Barcelona.

Cyclist Eduard Novak was the best Romanian athlete since then, winning three medals between the 2008 and 2012 Summer Paralympics (one gold in 2012 and two silver in 2008 and 2012), Romanian judoka Alex Bologa was the only medalist at the 2016 Summer Paralympics winning a bronze.

Medalists

See also
 Romania at the Olympics

References